Adam Allouche is a French-Lebanese international swimmer that holds 4 Lebanese national records in swimming. 
Allouche originating from Les Ulis, France, represented Lebanon during:
the Mediterranean Games in Mersin, Turkey in 2013,
the 12th FINA World Championships 25m in Doha, Qatar in 2014,
the 16th FINA World Championships 50m in Kazan, Russia in 2015,
the 10th Asian Championships 50m in Tokyo, Japan in 2016,
the 13th FINA World Championships 25m in Windsor, Canada in 2016.

References
http://www.lesulis.fr/fileadmin/lesulis/MEDIA/Publications/Magazine_Des_Ulissiens/2012/mdu_2012_03.pdf

1993 births
Living people
Lebanese male swimmers
People from Les Ulis
Swimmers at the 2013 Mediterranean Games
Mediterranean Games competitors for Lebanon